Gabriela Sabatini defeated the two-time defending champion Steffi Graf in the final, 6–2, 7–6(7–4) to win the women's singles tennis title at the 1990 US Open. It was her first and only major singles title, despite reaching eighteen semifinals and three finals during her career. The final was a rematch of the 1988 final and the 1989 semifinals. Sabatini became the first Argentine to win the title.

Seeds
The seeded players are listed below. Sabatini is the champion; others show the round in which they were eliminated.

Qualifying

Draw

Finals

Top half

Section 1

Section 2

Section 3

Section 4

Bottom half

Section 5

Section 6

Section 7

Section 8

External links
1990 US Open – Women's draws and results at the International Tennis Federation

Women's Singles
US Open (tennis) by year – Women's singles
1990 in women's tennis
1990 in American women's sports